This is a select bibliography of English language books (including translations) and journal articles about the History of Central Asia. A brief selection of English translations of primary sources is included. Book entries have references to journal articles and reviews about them when helpful.   Additional bibliographies can be found in many of the book-length works listed below; see Further Reading for several book and chapter-length bibliographies. The External Links section contains entries for publicly available select bibliographies from universities. this bibliography specifically excludes non-history related works and self-published books.

Inclusion criteria
Geographic scope of the works include the present day areas of: Kazakhstan, Kyrgyzstan, Tajikistan, Turkmenistan, Uzbekistan, and peripheral regions such as Afghanistan, Afghan Turkestan, Caspian Sea, Mongolia, East Turkestan, Xinjiang, and Iran as they relate to the history of Central Asia.

Included works should either be published by an academic or notable publisher, or be authored by a notable subject matter expert and have positive reviews in significant scholarly journals.

Formatting and citation style
This bibliography uses APA style citations. Entries do not use templates; references to reviews and notes for entries do use citation templates. 
Where books which are only partially related to Central Asian history are listed, the titles for chapters or sections should be indicated if possible, meaningful, and not excessive.

If a work has been translated into English, the translator should be included and a footnote with appropriate bibliographic information for the original language version should be included.

When listing works with titles or names published with alternative English spellings, the form used in the latest published version should be used and the version and relevant bibliographic information noted if it previously was published or reviewed under a different title.

General surveys
 Baumer, C. (2016). The History of Central Asia (Four volumes). London: I.B. Tauris.
 Beckwith, C. I. (2009). Empires of the Silk Road: A History of Central Eurasia from the Bronze Age to the Present. Princeton: Princeton University Press.
 Khalid, A. (2021). Central Asia: A New History from the Imperial Conquests to the Present. Princeton: Princeton University Press.
 Montgomery, D. W. (Ed.). (2022). Central Asia: Contexts for Understanding (Central Eurasia in Context). Pittsburgh: University of Pittsburgh Press.

Periods

Pre-colonial era
 Under Construction

Russian colonial era
 Becker, S. (2004). Russia's Protectorates in Central Asia: Bukhara and Khiva, 1865–1924. London: Routledge.
 Carrere d'Encausse, Helene. (1988). Islam and the Russian Empire: Reform and Revolution in Central Asia. Berkeley: University of California Press.
 Geyer, D. (1987). Russian Imperialism: The Interaction of Domestic and Foreign Policy 1860–1914. New Haven, CT: Yale University Press.
 Kappeler, A. (2001). The Russian Empire: A Multiethnic History (A. Clayton, trans.). Harlow: Longman.
 Khodarkovsky, M. (2002). Russia's Steppe Frontier: The Making of a Colonial Empire, 1500–1800. Bloomington, IN: Indiana University Press.
 LeDonne, J. P. (1997). The Russian Empire and the World 1700–1917: The Geopolitics of Expansion and Containment, Oxford: Oxford University Press.
 Morrison, A., Drieu, C., & Chokobaeva, A. (Eds.). (2020). The Central Asian Revolt of 1916: A Collapsing Empire in the Age of War and Revolution. Manchester: Manchester University Press.
 Morrison, A. (2021). The Russian Conquest of Central Asia: A Study in Imperial Expansion, 1814–1914. Cambridge: Cambridge University Press.
 Reeves, M. (2022). Infrastructures of Empire in Central Asia. Kritika: Explorations in Russian and Eurasian History, 23(2), 364-370.
 Rywkin, M. (ed.). (1988). Russian Colonial Expansion to 1917. London: Mansell Publishing.

Soviet era
 Cameron, S. (2018). The Hungry Steppe: Famine, Violence, and the Making of Soviet Kazakhstan. Ithaca: Cornell University Press.
 Chaqueri, C. (1995). The Soviet Socialist Republic of Iran, 1920-1921: Birth of the Trauma. Pittsburgh, PA: University of Pittsburgh Press.
 Khalid, A. (1996). Tashkent 1917: Muslim Politics in Revolutionary Turkestan. Slavic Review, 55(2), pp. 270–296.
 ———. (2000). The Politics of Muslim Cultural Reform: Jadidism in Central Asia. New York, NY: Oxford University Press.
 ———. (2001). Nationalizing the Revolution in Central Asia: The Transformation of Jadidism, 1917–1920. In Suny, R. G. and Martin, T. (Eds.). A State of Nations: Empire and Nation-Making in the Age of Lenin and Stalin. (pp. 145–164). New York, NY: Oxford University Press.
 ———. (2006). Between Empire and Revolution: New Work on Soviet Central Asia. Kritika: Explorations in Russian and Eurasian History, 7(4), pp. 865–884.
 ———. (2015). Making Uzbekistan: Nation, Empire, and Revolution in the Early USSR. Ithaca, NY: Cornell University Press.
 Marwat, F. R. K. (1985). The Basmachi Movement in Soviet Central Asia: A Study in Political Development. Peshawar: Emjay Books International.
 Massell, G. J. (1974). The Surrogate Proletariat: Moslem Women and Revolutionary Strategies in Soviet Central Asia, 1919–1929. Princeton, NJ: Princeton University Press.
 Park, A. G. (1957). Bolshevism in Turkestan 1917-1927. New York, NY: Columbia University Press.
 Sabol, Steven. (1995). The Creation of Soviet Central Asia: The 1924 National Delimitation. Central Asian Survey, 14(2), pp. 225–241.
 Sareen, T. R. (1989). British Iintervention in Central Asia and Trans-Caucasia. New Delhi, India: Anmol Publications.
 Sokol, E. D. (1954/2016). The Revolt of 1916 in Russian Central Asia. Baltimore, MD: Johns Hopkins University Press.
 Vaidyanath, R. (1967). The Formation of the Soviet Central Asian Republics: A Study in Soviet Nationalities Policy, 1917–1936. New Delhi, India: People's Publishing House.

Post Soviet era
 Menon, R. (1995). In the Shadow of the Bear: Security in Post-Soviet Central Asia. International Security, 20(1), 149–181.

Regional histories

Borderlands
 Keller, S. (2020). Russia and Central Asia: Coexistence, Conquest, Convergence. Toronto: University of Toronto Press.

Afghan Turkestan
 Under construction

Caspian Sea
 Under construction

East Turkestan
 Under construction

Iran
 Under construction

Xinjiang
 Under construction

Others
 Under construction

National

Kazakhstan
 Cameron, S. (2018). The Hungry Steppe: Famine, Violence, and the Making of Soviet Kazakhstan. Ithaca: Cornell University Press.
 Yarashevich, V. (2014). Post-communist Economic Integration: Belarus, Kazakhstan, and Russia. Journal of Economic Integration, 29(4), 582–623.

Kyrgyzstan
 Under construction

Tajikistan
 Under construction

Turkmenistan
 Under construction

Uzbekistan
 Khalid, A. (2015). Making Uzbekistan: Nation, Empire, and Revolution in the Early USSR. Ithaca, NY: Cornell University Press.

Transnational regions

Khorasan
 Under construction

Sistan
 Under construction

Transoxiana
 Under construction

Other
 Khalid, A. (1996). Tashkent 1917: Muslim Politics in Revolutionary Turkestan. Slavic Review, 55(2), pp. 270–296.

Topical studies
 Under Construction

Arts and culture
 Under construction

Family and marriage
 Edgar, A., & Frommer, B. (Eds.). (2020). Intermarriage from Central Europe to Central Asia: Mixed Families in the Age of Extremes. Lincoln: University of Nebraska Press.

Gender and sexuality
 Under construction

Violence, terror, and famine
 Martin, T. (1998). The Origins of Soviet Ethnic Cleansing. The Journal of Modern History, 70(4), 813–861.

Mongol conquest of Central Asia
 Under Construction

Economics and trade
 Beckwith, C. I. (2009). Empires of the Silk Road: A History of Central Eurasia from the Bronze Age to the Present. Princeton: Princeton University Press.
 Frankopan, P. (2016). The Silk Roads: A New History of the World. London: Bloomsbury.
 Hansen, V. (2012). The Silk Road: A New History. Oxford: Oxford University Press.
 Pomfret, R. (2019). The Central Asian Economies in the Twenty-First Century: Paving a New Silk Road. Princeton: Princeton University Press.

Rural and agricultural studies
 Under construction

Urban and industrial studies
 Under construction

Other
 Buell, P. D., Anderson, E. N., de Pablo Moya, M., & Oskenbay, M. (2020). Crossroads of Cuisine: The Eurasian Heartland, the Silk Roads and Food. Leiden: Brill.
 Pickett, J. (2020). Polymaths of Islam: Power and Networks of Knowledge in Central Asia. Ithaca: Cornell University Press.

Biographies
 Under Construction

Historiography and memory studies
 Under Construction

Other studies
 Bruno, A. (2022). An Anthropocene History of Central Asia. Kritika: Explorations in Russian and Eurasian History, 23(2), 339-344.
 Lajus, J. (2022). Aridity and the History of Water in Central Asia and Beyond. Kritika: Explorations in Russian and Eurasian History, 23(2), 358-363.

Reference works
 Under Construction

English language translations of primary sources
 Under Construction

Academic journals
 Central Asian Survey (1982present); published quarterly by Taylor & Francis;  (print),  (online).
 Journal of Borderlands Studies (1986present); five issues per year published by Taylor & Francis for the Association for Borderlands Studies;  (print),  (online).

Further reading
The below works have extensive bibliographies about Central Asian history.
 Appendix: Suggestions for further reading. In Khalid, A. (2021). Central Asia: A New History from the Imperial Conquests to the Present. Princeton: Princeton University Press.
 Dagikhudo, D. (2022). Central Asian Ismailis: An Annotated Bibliography of Russian, Tajik and Other Sources. London: Bloomsbury Academic.

See also
 Bibliography of Afghanistan
 Bibliography of Russian history
 Bibliography of the Soviet Union (disambiguation)
 Soviet Central Asia

References

Notes

Citations

External links
 [ ]

 
Central Asia